The 1921–22 North Carolina Tar Heels men's basketball team represented the University of North Carolina during the 1921–22 NCAA men's basketball season in the United States. The team finished the season with a 15–6 record and won the 1922 Southern Conference men's basketball tournament.

References

North Carolina Tar Heels men's basketball seasons
North Carolina
North Carolina Tar Heels Men's Basketball Team
North Carolina Tar Heels Men's Basketball Team